Adriaan John Carelse (born 8 February 1995) is a South African rugby union player for the Dallas Jackals of Major League Rugby (MLR). His regular position is fly-half of fullback. He previously played for Rugby ATL in the MLR.

Rugby career

2013–2014 : Western Province

Carelse was born in Somerset West. He attended and played rugby for Hottentots Holland High School, captaining their first team in 2013. He was selected to represent  at the Under-18 Academy Week in the same year, kicking four conversions in his three matches.

In 2014, he was a member of the  squad that participated in the 2014 Under-19 Provincial Championship. He appeared in ten of their twelve matches during the regular season, scoring one try against the Golden Lions and a brace in their 43–24 victory over the Leopards as Western Province finished in third place on the log to qualify for the title play-offs. Carelse was an unused replacement in their 29–22 victory over the Free State in the semi-finals, but came on as a replacement in the final, helping his team win the title by beating the s 33–26 in Cape Town.

2015–present : Boland Cavaliers

Carelse moved to fellow Western Cape side  for the 2015 season. He was catapulted into their senior team that participated in the Currie Cup qualification series. The Boland Cavaliers won just two of their matches during the series to see them finish in fourth position, failing to qualify for the 2015 Currie Cup Premier Division, instead progressing to the First Division.

After starting two matches for the  team in Group B of the 2015 Under-21 Provincial Championship, he returned to the first team, making two starts and two appearances as a replacement in the Currie Cup First Division. The team had a poor season, losing all five matches, and Carelse failed to score any points for the side. However, despite having home advantage in the semi-finals, they lost 15–19 to an SWD team that finished fourth on the log to be eliminated from the competition.

Carelse established himself as the Boland Cavaliers' first choice fly-half for the 2016 Currie Cup qualification competition, appearing in all fourteen of their matches and starting ten of those. It proved to be a successful campaign under new head coach Brent Janse van Rensburg, with Boland finishing in third position in the competition to qualify for the Premier Division for the first time since 2009.

Carelse signed with Rugby ATL for the 2021 Major League Rugby season.

References

South African rugby union players
Living people
1995 births
People from Somerset West
Rugby union fly-halves
Rugby union fullbacks
Boland Cavaliers players
Free State Cheetahs players
Cheetahs (rugby union) players
Rugby ATL players
Dallas Jackals players
Rugby union players from the Western Cape